Pan Shenghua (born 3 March 1957) is a Chinese water polo player, and coach. He competed in the men's tournament at the 1984 Summer Olympics.

He was assistant coach at the 2008 Summer Olympics, and 2012 Summer Olympics. He was coach of the Chinese women's team, at the Water polo at the 2005 World Aquatics Championships, and Water polo at the 2007 World Aquatics Championships.

References

External links
 https://www.zimbio.com/photos/Pan+Shenghua/XII+FINA+World+Championships+Day+7/qe2PRb7kxCh

1957 births
Living people
Chinese male water polo players
Olympic water polo players of China
Water polo players at the 1984 Summer Olympics
Place of birth missing (living people)
Asian Games medalists in water polo
Water polo players at the 1982 Asian Games
Medalists at the 1982 Asian Games
Asian Games gold medalists for China
20th-century Chinese people